Joseph or Joe Sutton may refer to: 
 Joseph Sutton (college president),  American academic and president of Indiana University
 Joseph William Sutton, Australian engineer, shipbuilder and inventor
 Joseph Wilson Sutton, American minister of the Episcopal Church
 Joe Sutton, American playwright
 Joe Sutton (journalist), American journalist and designer
 Joe Sutton (American football), American football player